Although women have participated in boxing for almost as long as the sport has existed, female fights have been effectively outlawed for most of boxing's history until recently, with athletic commissioners refusing to sanction or issue licenses to women boxers, and most nations officially banning the sport. Reports of women entering the ring go back to the 18th century.

Historical overview 

One of the earliest mentions of women’s boxing is in the travelogue of a German man who visited London in 1710. While taking in a men's boxing match, he met a woman in the audience who claimed to have previously boxed another woman in the same venue.

One of the earliest known women’s boxing matches to have been advertised in print was in London between Elizabeth Wilkinson and Hannah Hyfield in 1722. Billing herself as the "European Championess", Wilkinson and her husband would also fight other mixed couples as a pair, with Wilkinson fighting the other woman, and her husband fighting the other man. In those days, the rules of boxing allowed kicking, gouging and other methods of attack not part of today's arsenal.

Women's boxing first appeared in the Olympic Games as a demonstration sport in 1904, in St. Louis.

During the 1920s, Professor Andrew Newton formed a Women's Boxing Club in London. However women's boxing was hugely controversial. In early 1926, Shoreditch borough council banned an arranged exhibition match between boxers Annie Newton and Madge Baker, a student of Digger Stanley. An attempt to hold the match in nearby Hackney instead was defeated by a campaign led by the Mayor of Hackney, who wrote, "I regard this proposed exhibition of women boxers as a gratification of the sensual ideals of a crowd of vulgar men." The Home Secretary Sir William Joynson-Hicks was among those opposing the match, claiming "the Legislature never imagined that such a disgraceful exhibition would have been staged in this country." The story was reported across the country and even internationally.

In 1988 the Swedish Amateur Boxing Association sanctioned events for women.

In 1997 the British Amateur Boxing Association sanctioned its first boxing competition for women. The first event was meant to be between two thirteen-year-olds, but one of the boxers dropped out because of hostile media attention. A month later, an event was held between two sixteen-year-olds.

Although women fought professionally in many countries, in the United Kingdom the B.B.B.C. refused to issue licences to women until they issued one to Jane Couch in 1998. By the end of the century, however, they had issued five such licenses. The first sanctioned professional bout between women in the U.K. was in November 1998 at Streatham in London, between Jane Couch and Simona Lukic.

The International Boxing Association (amateur) accepted new rules for women’s boxing at the end of the 20th century and approved the first European Cup for Women in 1999 and the first World Championship for women in 2001. In October 2001 the first women’s world amateur boxing championships, called the 2001 Women's World Amateur Boxing Championships, were held in Scranton, in the United States.

Women's boxing was not featured at the 2008 Olympics; however, on 14 August 2009, it was announced that the International Olympic Committee's Executive Board (EB) had approved the inclusion of women's boxing for the Games in London in the 2012 Olympics, contrary to the expectations of some observers. Around these (2009) hearings, in conjunction with AIBA (International Boxing Association), the International Olympic Committee agreed to include three additional women's weight classes to the 2012 London Olympic Games. A new "gender-appropriate" women's boxing uniform was being created at the time, which would have required women (under AIBA rules) to wear skirts during competition. The issue was widely ignored by the public until amateur boxer and London student Elizabeth Plank brought the issue to light. She created a petition at Change.com to end the gender-based mandatory uniforms. It was eventually decided (before the 2012 Olympics) to give women boxers the option of wearing shorts or a skirt.

Women were allowed to competitively box for the first time at the Olympics during the 2012 Summer Olympics in London, producing the world's first 12 female Olympic medalist boxers. Nicola Adams of Great Britain won the world’s first Olympic women's boxing gold medal.

On 14 September 2014, after defeating Croatian Ivana Habazin, Cecilia Brækhus became the first Norwegian and the first woman to hold all major world championship belts in her weight division (welterweight) in boxing history.

In 2015 the World Boxing Federation unified various women's titles to have one title holder.

Argentina 
In Argentina, women's boxing has experienced a notable rise in popularity, due in part to the presence of boxers such as Alejandra Oliveras, Marcela Acuna, Yesica Bopp and Erica Farias.

Australia 

While not being urged to avoid competition, women had few opportunities to compete in sport in Australia until the 1880s. After that date, new sporting facilities were being built around the country and many new sport clubs were created. Boxing classes were being offered to women in Australia by 1892, at locations such as the Brisbane Gymnasium on Turbot Street, close to the city's railway station. While classes may have been offered for women, serious training was not permitted for women by the 1900s and women were banned from pursuing the sport in a competitive way. Women were also barred from attending boxing matches. New South Wales banned women's boxing from 1986 to 2009. Women's boxing was resumed in NSW with an exhibition fight between Kaye Scott and Ramona Stephenson in October 2009. Women's boxing was legalized in Queensland in 2000.

In 2002, Desi Kontos of South Australia became the first Australian woman to represent the country at the boxing world championships.

Naomi Fischer-Rasmussen was the first female boxer to represent Australia at the Olympics when she competed at the 2012 Summer Olympics.

Canada 
In 2023, women competed in boxing at the Canada Games for the first time. Talia Birch of Team Quebec and Emily Vigneault of Team Alberta won the first Canada Games gold medals for boxing in their divisions; Birch won in the 52-kg female division and Vigneault won in the 60-kg female division. Those were the only female divisions in boxing in the 2023 Canada Games.

Cuba 
In 2022 women became allowed to participate officially in the sport of boxing in Cuba, for the first time since they were banned from doing so during the Revolution of Fidel Castro in 1959.

Czech Republic 
Fabiana Bytyqi became the first female boxer from the Czech Republic to win a major world title, when she defeated Denise Castle in 2018 to win the vacant WBC atomweight title. The fight took place at the Sportcentrum Sluneta in Ústí nad Labem, on 22 September 2018. She won the fight by unanimous decision, with two judges awarding her a 100–90 scorecard, while the third judge awarded her a 99–91 scorecard.

Gaza Strip 
In 2019 the first female boxing club in the Gaza Strip, the Palestinian Center of Boxing for Women, opened.

India 
Mary Kom of India is a five-time World Amateur Boxing champion. She is the only woman boxer to have won a medal in each one of the six world championships.

Three Indian female boxers, namely, Pinki Jangra, Mary Kom, and Kavita Chahal were placed in the world's top three in AIBA world rankings (1 March 2014) in their respective categories.

Iran 
Sadaf Khadem defeated French boxer Anne Chauvin in a boxing match in France on April 14, 2019; this made her the first Iranian woman to be part of an official boxing match. However, the Iranian Boxing Federation distanced itself from the match and released a statement reading: As women's boxing is not a sanctioned sport of the Islamic Republic of Iran Boxing Federation, the organization, training, and participation in this sport is not related to this federation and it is the organizer and participant's responsibilities.Following the match, Khadem had plans to return to Iran, but lingering rumors of potential arrest warrants kept her in France. Khadem's representative told Reuters that authorities had issued arrest warrants against her. Hossein Soori, the head of Iran's boxing federation, denied Khadem would be arrested, attributing the information to “media linked to Saudi Arabia”.

Ireland 
Deirdre Nelson was granted a professional boxing licence by the British Boxing Board of Control in February 1999, which gave her the right to box anywhere within the European Boxing Union. However, the Boxing Union of Ireland forbid her to box until guidelines on women’s boxing were issued by the European Boxing Union in September 1999. In 2001 Nelson won a sex discrimination case against the Boxing Union of Ireland due to this; she was awarded £1,500 in compensation. The Employment Equality Authority (based in Dublin) stated that the Boxing Union of Ireland had discriminated against Nelson, violating the Employment Equality Act of 1977.

In 2001, Katie Taylor won the first officially sanctioned female boxing match in Ireland, at the National Stadium, defeating Alanna Audley from Belfast.

Mexico 
In 1998 Laura Serrano was supposed to fight in Mexico City, but the match was canceled due to a 1947 ban against women boxing in Mexico City. The ban was eventually ended. In 2015 Serrano became the first female Mexican boxer inducted into the International Women's Boxing Hall of Fame.

In 2005 Mexican female boxer Jackie Nava became the first woman to win a female world title fight sanctioned by the WBC.

The Netherlands 
In 2019, Lucia Rijker became one of the first three women boxers (and the first Dutch woman boxer) elected to the International Boxing Hall of Fame; 2019 was the first year that women were on the ballot.

Norway 
On 14 September 2014, after defeating Croatian Ivana Habazin, Cecilia Brækhus became the first Norwegian and the first woman to hold all major world championship belts in her weight division (welterweight) in boxing history.

Saudi Arabia 
In 2022, Somalian boxer Ramla Ali defeated Dominican boxer Crystal Garcia Nova in the first professional women’s boxing match held in Saudi Arabia. In 2023, Ragad Al-Naimi became the first Saudi female professional boxer, by having her first professional fight; she won against Perpetual Okaidah in a fight held in Diriyah.

Somalia 
Ramla Ali was the first boxer to win an international gold medal while representing Somalia. Later, in 2021, she competed in the women's featherweight event at the 2020 Summer Olympics. Although she lost her first fight, she became the first boxer ever to represent Somalia on the Olympic stage. In 2022, she defeated Dominican boxer Crystal Garcia Nova in the first professional women’s boxing match held in Saudi Arabia.

Sweden 
In 1988 the Swedish Amateur Boxing Association sanctioned events for women.

United Kingdom 
One of the earliest mentions of women’s boxing is in the travelogue of a German man who visited London in 1710. While taking in a men's boxing match, he met a woman in the audience who claimed to have previously boxed another woman in the same venue.

One of the earliest known fights to have been advertised in print was in London between Elizabeth Wilkinson and Hannah Hyfield in 1722. Billing herself as the "European Championess", Wilkinson and her husband would also fight other mixed couples as a pair, with Wilkinson fighting the other woman and her husband, the other man. In those days, the rules of boxing allowed kicking, gouging and other methods of attack not part of today's arsenal.

During the 1920s, Professor Andrew Newton formed a Women's Boxing Club in London. However women's boxing was hugely controversial. In early 1926, Shoreditch borough council banned an arranged exhibition match between boxers Annie Newton and Madge Baker, a student of Digger Stanley. An attempt to hold the match in nearby Hackney instead was defeated by a campaign led by the Mayor of Hackney, who wrote, "I regard this proposed exhibition of women boxers as a gratification of the sensual ideals of a crowd of vulgar men." The Home Secretary Sir William Joynson-Hicks was among those opposing the match, claiming "the Legislature never imagined that such a disgraceful exhibition would have been staged in this country." The story was reported across the country and even internationally.

In 1997 the British Amateur Boxing Association sanctioned its first boxing competition for women. The first event was meant to be between two thirteen-year-olds, but one of the boxers dropped out because of hostile media attention. A month later, an event was held between two sixteen-year-olds.

Jane Couch became the first licensed female boxer in the United Kingdom in 1998. The British Boxing Board of Control initially refused to grant Couch a professional licence on the sole ground that she was a woman, and argued that PMS made women too unstable to box. Claiming sexual discrimination and supported by the Equal Opportunities Commission, Couch managed to have this decision overturned by a tribunal in March 1998. However, some criticism followed as the British Medical Association called this result "a demented extension of equal opportunities". The first sanctioned professional boxing match between women in the U.K. was in November 1998 at Streatham in London, between Couch and Simona Lukic. Couch won.

In 2001, Nicola Adams became the first woman boxer ever to represent England, which she did in a fight against an Irish boxer. In 2007 she became the first English female boxer to win a medal in a major boxing tournament, taking silver in the European Championships. In 2008 she won a silver medal that was Britain’s first women’s world championship medal in women’s boxing.

In 2009 Natasha Jonas became the first female boxer to compete for GB Boxing.

Women were allowed to competitively box for the first time at the Olympics during the 2012 Summer Olympics in London, producing the world's first 12 female Olympic medalist boxers. Representing Great Britain, Nicola Adams won the world’s first Olympic women's boxing gold medal. This win also made her the first openly LGBT person to win an Olympic boxing gold medal.

In 2019 English boxer Barbara Buttrick became one of the first three women boxers (and the first English woman boxer) elected to the International Boxing Hall of Fame; 2019 was the first year that women were on the ballot.

In 2022 two female boxers headlined at a major venue in the United Kingdom for the first time, which occurred at the O2 Arena. That fight was a title unification bout between Claressa Shields and Savannah Marshall. Shields won via unanimous decision with two judges scoring the fight 97–93 and one scoring it 96–94, all in favor of Shields to become the undisputed middleweight world champion. As well, the fight headlined the first all-female boxing card in the United Kingdom. Later in the year, Chantelle Cameron defeated Jessica McCaskill in a match held in Abu Dhabi, making Cameron the undisputed world light-welterweight champion and the United Kingdom’s first undisputed female boxing world champion.

Natasha Jonas won the British Boxing Board of Control’s 2022 British Boxer of the Year award, which made her the first woman to win the British Boxing Board of Control's British Boxer of the Year Award.

United States  

In 1876, the first women's boxing match was held in the United States. In this match Nell Saunders defeated Rose Harland. Her prize was a silver butter dish.

Women's boxing first appeared in the Olympic Games as a demonstration sport in 1904, in St. Louis.

In 1954, Barbara Buttrick was part of the first boxing match between two women on American national television.

In 1975, Caroline Svendsen became the first woman to receive a boxing license in the United States when she was granted one in Nevada.

Also in 1975, Jackie Tonawanda sued the New York State Athletic Commission (NYSAC) for denying her a boxing license because of her gender. This resulted in the case Garrett v. New York State Athletic Commission (1975) at the New York Supreme Court (Tonawanda was also known as Jacqueline Garrett) which was decided in her favor. However, this did not overturn the law in New York against women boxing. But Cathy Davis sued the New York State Athletic Commission in 1977 because she was denied a boxing license because she was a woman, and the case was decided in her favor later that year, with the judge
invalidating New York State rule number 205.15, which stated, “No woman may be licensed as a boxer or second or licensed to compete in any wrestling exhibition with men.” In his opinion the judge cited the precedent set by Garrett v. New York State Athletic Commission (1975), which “found the regulation invalid under the equal protection clauses of the State and Federal Constitutions”. The NYSAC filed an appeal of the ruling, but later dropped it. In August 1978 Cathy Davis became the first woman to be on the cover of The Ring. On September 19, 1978, Davis received the NYSAC’s first boxing license given to a female boxer.

In 1976, Pat Pineda became the first female boxer to be licensed in California.

In 1979, a lawsuit made California change its boxing regulations, which had limited women boxers to no more than four rounds.

During the 1980s, women's boxing briefly resurfaced in public notice in California due to the twin sisters Dora and Cora Webber. They were world champions. Other women boxers went on hunger strikes to be noticed.

But the boom of women's boxing came during the 1990s, coinciding with the boom in professional women sports leagues such as the WNBA and WUSA, and with boxers such as Stephanie Jaramillo, Delia 'Chikita' Gonzalez, Christy Martin, Laila Ali, Jackie Frazier-Lyde, Bonnie Canino and Sumya Anani, all world champions, jumping into the scene.

On 16 April 1992, after eight years in court in Massachusetts, Gail Grandchamp won her battle to become a boxer, as a Massachusetts state Superior Court judge ruled it was illegal to deny someone a chance to box based on gender. During her battle to win the right to box as an amateur, she passed the age of 36, the maximum age for amateur fighters. Even though she knew it would not help her as an amateur, Grandchamp continued her efforts, and eventually did box professionally for a time.

Dallas Malloy was denied an application by USA Boxing due to being female. She sued and U.S. District Judge Barbara Rothstein allowed her to box by granting a preliminary injunction. In October 1993, Malloy defeated Heather Poyner in the United States’ first sanctioned amateur boxing match between two female boxers. USA Boxing lifted its ban on women's boxing later in 1993. When USA Boxing officially recognized women's boxing in 1993, it became the first organization to do so in the world.

Also in 1993, Don King, the world-famous boxing promoter, signed American boxer Christy Martin in October, making Martin the first female boxer to sign with King.

In 1995, the New York Golden Gloves allowed women boxers to compete for the first time.

On March 16, 1996, a boxing match took place that is often called the fight that "put women's boxing on the map", or "the bout that made women's boxing". It was held in Nevada between American Christy Martin and Irishwoman Deirdre Gogarty. The fight was won by Martin, in a six rounds unanimous decision, and led to her featuring as the first female boxer on the cover of Sports Illustrated on April 15, 1996; the headline read, "The Lady Is a Champ".

In October 2001 the first women’s world amateur boxing championships, called the 2001 Women's World Amateur Boxing Championships, were held in Scranton, in the United States.

On April 2, 2005 Becky Zerlentes was participating in the Colorado State Boxing Senior Female Championships at the Denver Coliseum in Denver, Colorado. She was knocked out in the third round by her opponent, Heather Schmitz, fell unconscious, and died without regaining consciousness. This made Zerlentes the first woman known to have died of injuries sustained during a sanctioned boxing match in the United States. According to the Denver County coroner the cause of death was blunt force trauma to the head.

In 2014 the International Women's Boxing Hall of Fame, located in America, held its first induction.

In 2016, Christy Martin became the first female boxer inducted into the Nevada Boxing Hall of Fame.

American major boxing broadcasting network HBO broadcast its first women's bout, between Norway's Cecilia Brækhus and America’s Kali Reis, on May 5, 2018, which Brækhus won.

In 2019 American boxer Christy Martin became one of the first three women boxers (and the first American woman boxer) elected to the International Boxing Hall of Fame; 2019 was the first year that women were on the ballot.

The first women's boxing match to headline Madison Square Garden, described as the 'biggest women's fight of all time', was held on April 30, 2022, between Katie Taylor and Amanda Serrano, with Taylor’s undisputed lightweight titles on the line. Taylor defeated Serrano by split decision.

Professional women's boxing has declined in popularity in the United States and struggles to get viewership and sponsorship. Many women boxers have to fight in Mexico or Europe in order to make a good living. The sport has largely been supplanted by Women's MMA.

Differences between men and women's boxing rules 
Amateur boxing bouts are four rounds of two minutes for women and three rounds of three minutes for men, each with a one-minute interval between rounds.

As stated by the International Boxing Association Technical Rules and Competition Rules:

– head guards are necessary for female boxers of any age;

– a breast guard is advised for female fighters in addition to a pubic (crotch) guard;

– pregnant sportswomen are not allowed to engage in combat.

See also 

 List of current female world boxing champions
 List of female boxers
 List of IBF female world champions
 List of WBA female world champions
 List of WBC female world champions
 List of WBO female world champions
 List of WIBO world champions
 Women Boxing Archive Network
 Women's boxing in Australia

References

Bibliography

External links 

 Women's Boxing Archive Network